Dominic Carman (born 23 August 1961) is a British journalist, writer and Liberal Democrat political activist.

Family
Dominic Carman was born on 23 August 1961 in Hale, Cheshire. Educated at Manchester Grammar School and Durham University, Carman is the son of barrister George Carman. He wrote a biography of his father, No Ordinary Man: A Life of George Carman, which was published in 2002.

Politics and anti-BNP campaigner
When he was sixteen, Carman spent three weeks as a member of the National Front in September 1977. Writing about this in The Guardian in 2010, he commented "Becoming a member was done rashly, angrily, without any thought of what it meant, or of the consequences. It was a stupid decision, undertaken with one purpose: to annoy my father." He also said "When I eventually sat down and opened National Front News, my sense of euphoric defiance ended – very abruptly", as it was filled with "hate-filled articles" about Jewish people, Holocaust denial and black and Asian immigration into Britain. "Disgusted and shocked, my stomach churned, my thoughts ran wild. So this is what they believed. Oh God, what had I done? ... I immediately resigned from the NF, less than a month after joining."

In 2005, he took part in ITV's Vote for Me television programme in which the public selected an individual to stand at the next general election, losing in the final to Rodney Hylton-Potts.

Carman researched an unofficial biography of British National Party leader Nick Griffin, but this has not been published. Carman used his research to support his campaign as the Liberal Democrat candidate in Barking at the 2010 General Election, where he stood against Griffin.

He contested the 2011 Barnsley Central by-election for the Liberal Democrats, coming in sixth place and losing his deposit, an unusual occurrence for a candidate of a major political party in the UK. In an article in the Daily Mail, Carman was critical of some of the Barnsley electorate, stating that "diversity and difference are not welcome here"; he defended his comments when interviewed by Andrew Neil on the BBC's The Politics Show.

Further reading

Elections contested
UK Parliament Elections

References

External links
 "Dominic Carman" – at The Guardian
reportslegal.com

1961 births
Living people
Liberal Democrats (UK) parliamentary candidates
Alumni of Hatfield College, Durham
English male journalists
People from Hale, Greater Manchester
English journalists
English people of Irish descent